Halosbaenidae is a family of crustaceans belonging to the order Thermosbaenacea.

Genera:
 Halosbaena Stock, 1976
 Limnosbaena Stock, 1976
 Theosbaena Cals & Boutin, 1985

References

Crustaceans